This is a list of gliders/sailplanes of the world, (this reference lists all gliders with references, where available) 
Note: Any aircraft can glide for a short time, but gliders are designed to glide for longer.

Belgian miscellaneous constructors 

 Arplam Leuvense L-1 2-seat motor-glider - Leuvense University Aero Club
 Poncelet Castar – Poncelet, Paul – SABCA (Société Anonyme Belge de Construction Aéronautique)
 Poncelet Vivette – Poncelet, Paul – SABCA (Société Anonyme Belge de Construction Aéronautique)
 de Glymes Colanhan
 SABCA Jullien SJ-1 – Jullien, Henri – SABCA (Société Anonyme Belge de Construction Aéronautique)
 SABCA Junior – (Société Anonyme Belge de Construction Aéronautique)

Notes

Further reading

External links

Lists of glider aircraft